Jonathan Lloyd (born 10 May 1956 in West Cheshire) is the Chief Executive of UK Coal.

Early life
His father was headmaster at the Cheshire primary school he attended. He attended Chester City Grammar School (since 1971 called the Queens Park High School). He went to Liverpool Polytechnic and studied Estate Management.

Career
He became Property Director of UK Coal in May 2006.

Since 1 September 2007 he has been the Chief Executive of UK Coal, under the chairmanship of David Jones. He took over from Gerry Spindler.

Personal life
He lives in Marton, Harrogate, in the parish of Marton cum Grafton, and has a son. He is also stepfather to a son and daughter from his wife's first marriage.

External links
 UK Coal

News items
 Telegraph May 2009
 Telegraph April 2008

People from Chester
English chief executives
1956 births
Alumni of Liverpool John Moores University
People educated at Chester City Grammar School
Living people